John Murrell, OC, AOE (October 15, 1945 – November 11, 2019) was an American-born Canadian playwright.

Life and career
Born in Lubbock, Texas, Murrell moved to Alberta after graduating from Southwestern University in Georgetown, Texas with a BFA in 1968. He moved to Canada to avoid the draft, studying at the University of Calgary. In 2002 he was made an Officer of the Order of Canada and awarded the Alberta Order of Excellence. In 2008, he received the Governor General's Performing Arts Award for Lifetime Artistic Achievement, Canada's highest honour in the performing arts. for which he was the subject of a National Film Board of Canada animated short by Cam Christiansen entitled The Real Place.

Murrell also translated some Russian and French works.

Original plays by John Murrell
 Haydn's Head (1974)
 Power in the Blood (1975)
 Waiting for the Parade (1977)
 Memoir (1977)
 Farther West (1982)
 New World (1984)
 October (1988)
 Democracy (1991)
 The Faraway Nearby (1994)
 Death in New Orleans (1998)
 Taking Shakespeare (2012)

Translations/adaptations by John Murrell
 Mandragola (after Machiavelli) (1978)
 Uncle Vanya (after Chekhov) (1978)
 Bajazet (after Racine) (1979)
 The Seagull (after Chekhov) (1980)
 Divorcons (after Sardou) (1983)
 The Master Builder (after Ibsen) (1983)
 Oedipus the King (after Sophocles) (1988)
 The Four Lives of Marie (after Carole Frechette) (1996)
 The Cherry Orchard (after Chekhov) (1998)
 The Odyssey (after Homer) (2001)
 The Doll House (after Ibsen) (2001)
 The Human Voice (after Jean Cocteau) (2004)

References

External links 
 Bio from the Encyclopedia of Canadian Theatre.

1945 births
2019 deaths
20th-century Canadian dramatists and playwrights
21st-century Canadian dramatists and playwrights
Members of the Alberta Order of Excellence
Officers of the Order of Canada
People from Lubbock, Texas
American expatriate writers in Canada
Vietnam War draft evaders
Southwestern University alumni
Governor General's Performing Arts Award winners
Opera librettists
Writers from Texas
Writers from Alberta
Canadian librettists
Canadian male dramatists and playwrights
20th-century Canadian male writers
21st-century Canadian male writers